Clermont-le-Fort is a commune in the Haute-Garonne department in southwestern France.

Geography
The Ariège forms most of the commune's western border, with the Lèze, one of its tributaries, which flows here into the Ariège.

Population

See also
Communes of the Haute-Garonne department

References

Communes of Haute-Garonne